Kieran McCarthy (born 9 September 1942) is a retired Alliance Party of Northern Ireland (APNI) politician.  From 1998 to 2016 he was a member of the Northern Ireland Assembly for Strangford. He served as Assembly chief whip for APNI in the Assembly.

McCarthy was born in Newtownards and worked as a draper. In 1985 he was first elected to Ards Borough Council. In 1990 he became a Justice of the Peace. He was then elected to the Northern Ireland Peace Forum in 1996 from Strangford and has subsequently won a Northern Ireland Assembly seat there in all three elections to that body.  In the 2007 elections his seat was targeted by the Social Democratic and Labour Party (SDLP), but he won easily with a significantly increased vote.

He has stated his appreciation for the Good Friday Agreement on a number of occasions but believes a more party-aligned/devolved agreement would work more effectively.

McCarthy has stated his strong dislike for Direct Rule, causing a major democratic deficit, and in particular, was against the supposedly aggressive style of governing from the then Secretary of State for Northern Ireland, Peter Hain.

References

1942 births
Living people
Members of the Northern Ireland Forum
Northern Ireland MLAs 1998–2003
Northern Ireland MLAs 2003–2007
Northern Ireland MLAs 2007–2011
Northern Ireland MLAs 2011–2016
People from Newtownards
Alliance Party of Northern Ireland MLAs
Alliance Party of Northern Ireland councillors
Members of Ards Borough Council